The Ecclesiastical Province of Ontario is one of four ecclesiastical provinces in the Anglican Church of Canada. It was established in 1912 out of six dioceses of the Ecclesiastical Province of Canada located in the civil province of Ontario, and the Diocese of Moosonee from the Ecclesiastical Province of Rupert's Land.

Overview
The seven dioceses are:
 Algoma (Ontario), 
 Huron (Ontario), 
 Moosonee (Ontario and part of northern Quebec on the coast of James Bay), 
 Niagara (Ontario), 
 Ontario (Ontario), 
 Ottawa (Ontario and a portion of southwestern Quebec), and 
 Toronto (Ontario).

Provinces of the Anglican Church of Canada are headed by a Metropolitan, who is elected from among the province's diocesan bishops. This bishop then becomes Archbishop of his or her diocese and Metropolitan of the province. Since 2014, the Metropolitan of Ontario also becomes ex officio the diocesan Bishop of Moosonee. The current Metropolitan of the Province of Ontario is Anne Germond, Archbishop of Algoma and Moosonee, who succeeded Archbishop Colin Johnson of Toronto and Moosonee in October 2018.

The Metropolitan presides at the triennial meeting of the Provincial Synod of the Ecclesiastical Province of Ontario. The next Provincial Synod will take place in 2021. In addition, the Metropolitan presides at electoral synods and the consecration of bishops in the Ecclesiastical Province of Ontario.

Metropolitans of Ontario

See also
Ecclesiastical provinces of the Anglican Church of Canada
List of dioceses of the Anglican Church of Canada

References

External links

Ontario
Ontario, Ecclesiastical Province of
Anglican Church in Ontario
Christian organizations established in 1912
1912 establishments in Ontario